Crawfordville may refer to the following places in the United States:

Crawfordville, Florida
Crawfordville, Georgia

See also
Crawfordsville (disambiguation)